Bri Holt is an American inventor and businessman. He is best known for founding Engrade, a Santa Monica-based education technology startup. Mr. Holt founded Engrade in 2003 as a high school student trying to build a way for his own teachers to share students' grades online. Engrade was acquired by McGraw-Hill Education in January 2014.

In 2006, Mr Holt founded SocialMeter, the first social media analytics service. In 2007, SocialMeter was acquired by AdaptiveBlue, a startup backed by venture capital firm Union Square Ventures.

In 2007, Mr Holt pioneered the new field of viral video analytics, patenting a method for determining Internet video viewing time. Mr. Holt founded Vidmeter, an online video analytics platform, later acquired by Visible Measures in January 2008.

In 2020, Mr. Holt was issued a patent entitled Hyperpiler.

References

Living people
Year of birth missing (living people)
American computer businesspeople
American technology company founders
Chief technology officers
American technology chief executives
American software engineers
American computer programmers
21st-century American businesspeople
Businesspeople in information technology